The Estonian International in badminton is an international open held in Estonia since 2004 and is thereby one of the most recent international badminton tournaments in the world.

The tournament is now classified as BWF International Series (formerly Future Series) and admitted to the European Badminton Circuit. As many other international championships in badminton, that usually carry the name of the main sponsor, it is designed as Estonia Kalev International.

Previous winners

Performances by nation

References

External links
Yonex Estonian International

Badminton tournaments in Estonia
Recurring sporting events established in 2004